Eretmocera homalocrossa is a moth of the family Scythrididae. It was described by Edward Meyrick in 1930. It is found in Uganda.

The wingspan is 11–12 mm. The forewings are purple blue-blackish and the hindwings are dark grey.

The larvae have been recorded feeding on Amaranthus caudatus.

References

homalocrossa
Moths described in 1930